Latin dictionary may refer to:

 A Latin Dictionary
 Oxford Latin Dictionary
 Lexicon Recentis Latinitatis
 Orbis Latinus
 Thesaurus Linguae Latinae
 William Whitaker's Words